Legio VIII Augusta ("Augustus' Eighth Legion") was one of the oldest legions of the Imperial Roman army.

In republican service

They were ordered to Cisalpine Gaul around 58 BC by Julius Caesar and marched with him throughout the entirety of the Gallic Wars, especially during the battles of Gergovie and Alesia. During the war the legion won the title "Gallica." It also earned a reputation for courage.

They stood with him at the Battle of Pharsalus. The legion was also present in Egypt, when Caesar captured Egypt for Cleopatra. In 46 BC, it took part in the Battle of Thapsus near what is now Bakalta, Tunisia shortly before their disbandment. 

In 44 BC, Augustus reconstituted the legion that had helped him attain the control of the Roman Empire. In 43 BC it took part in the siege of the Battle of Mutina (current Modena) by Marc Antony, defended by the troops of Decimus Brutus, which earned Legio VIII Gallica the nickname "Mutinensis".

In imperial service

In or before 9 AD the legion was transferred to Poetovium (modern Ptuj). The legion must have won a victory around this time that earned them the cognomen Augusta.  At least a detachment also stayed in Burnum, Illyricum where their stamped tiles have been found.

Around 45 under Nero, the VIII Augusta took part in the suppression of the Thracian uprising, and founded its castrum at Novae where the Danube has its most southern bend and from where the legion controlled a long section of the river. 

The legion received the title "BIS AUGUSTA" (twice August) for their actions in Thrace. After Nero's death in 69 it gave up this title and in the confusion of the Year of the Four Emperors, the legion voted for Otho and sent a detachment of 2000 men to Italy (as did the 7th and the 3rd legions). Soon after Otho's death, the Danube legions voted for Vespasian and went with him to Mirebeau-sur-Bèze in Gaul. Where it built its new base in 70 CE to oppose the revolts of the Treveri and especially the Ubii and Lingones against Rome. 

After restoration of Rome`s rule in the North in or before 86, the legion moved to its new headquarters at Argentoratum in Germania Superior (now Strasbourg), where the main part of the unit was stationed until the 5th century.

The legion also fought the Parthian Empire with Septimius Severus, who ruled from 193 until 211, and with his successors. 

Records indicate that they were still active during the first years of the fourth century at the Rhine frontier. This means that the history of the legion covers more than 400 years of almost continuous service. In 371 it was again stationed in Argentoratum, according to an inscription. Later, the Roman general Stilicho, was compelled to move the German legions back to Italy to defend it against the Visigothic invasion.

According to Notitia Dignitatum, around 420 an Octaviani unit was under the Magister Peditum of Italia; it is possible that this unit was the old VIII Augusta, which was originally a comitatensis unit but had been promoted to palatina status.

Attested members

Epigraphic inscriptions

- ri[…] G̣allorum tribunus militum legionis VIII Augustae.   Cohort of Gauls, military [tribune] of the Eighth Legion Augusta. Brougham (Brocavum). CIL VII 300 = RIB 782.

See also
 List of Roman legions

References

External links

 livius.org account
  VEX LEG VIII AVG, German re-enactment society
  LEGION VIII AUGUSTA, French re-enactment society
 LEGIO VIII AUGUSTA, US re-enactment society
 LEGIO VIII AVGVSTA MGV, British re-enactment society
 Octaviani in Notitia Dignitatum

08 Augusta
Military units and formations established in the 1st century BC